Utkala Sammilaniis an Indian social and cultural organization. It was founded in Odisha in 1903 by Madhusudan Das and continues in present times.

History
Utkal Sammilani was founded by Madhusudan Das. Its first meeting was held in 1903 and included 62 "permanent members". The organization's first objective was to campaign for the unification of the state of Odisha.
 
A conference was held in 1920 in Chakradharpur and the organization decided to join the non-cooperation movement that had recently been endorsed by the Indian National Congress. It elected a new president, Basanta Kumar Panigrahi, in 2002.
 
In 2010, Utkal Samilani, requested that the Indian government grant "classical language status" to Odia and take appropriate actions to preserve the interests of the people who speak Odia but reside outside their home state. Utkal Sammilani was a key player in the transformation of the state of Orissa to its modern-day status as Odisha and it opposed Andhra Pradesh's Polavaram project in 2010.

References

External links
 Utkal Sammilani (1903–1936): Vol 1

Organisations based in Odisha
1903 establishments in India
Organizations established in 1903